"Don't Call Me" is a song by South Korean boy band Shinee. It was released on February 22, 2021, through SM Entertainment and served as the lead single for the album of the same name. "Don't Call Me" was composed by Kenzie, Dem Jointz and Rodnae "Chikk" Bell, and arranged by Dem Jointz, Yoo Young-jin, Kenzie, Ryan S. Jhun and Robbin, with the lyrics was written by Kenzie. It was the group's first single since members Onew, Key and Minho returned from the military.

Background
Following the release of Shinee's sixth studio album, The Story of Light, in 2018, the group took a three-year hiatus as members Onew, Key and Minho enlisted in the military to complete their mandatory service. Upon their return, SM Entertainment announced that Shinee would release a new album, titled Don't Call Me, fronted by the single of the same name. The song was originally intended for their labelmate BoA and favoured by company founder Lee Soo-man, who provided the group with guidance throughout the production process. Shinee considered a number of songs as lead single, but selected "Don't Call Me" because they felt it was different from what they had done before and left a strong impact. They also wanted a more performance-driven song.

Composition
"Don't Call Me" is a hip hop-inspired dance song which warns an ex-lover against calling following a betrayal. The lyrics, penned by Kenzie, express deep contempt towards their obsessive behaviour. The song incorporates 808 bass sounds, dark synths and heavy beats. In the latter part of the song, there is a piano section.

Release and promotion
Teaser images and videos were released beginning February 9, 2021. The group also set up a hotline where fans could listen to messages recorded by the members and leave their own messages in turn; however, the server crashed due to the overwhelming number of calls. Shinee previewed the song on the variety show Knowing Bros ahead of its release. "Don't Call Me" was released on February 22, 2021, alongside its music video and album. Shinee performed the song for the first time on M Countdown on February 25. Two remixes of "Don't Call Me" by Fox Stevenson and ESAI were released on March 27 through ScreaM Records. A Japanese version of the song was later included on Shinee's first Japanese extended play, Superstar.

Reception

Accolades

Credits and personnel
Credits adapted from the liner notes of Don't Call Me.

Recording
 Recorded and mixed at SM Blue Cup Studio
 Recorded, digitally edited and engineered for mix at SM Big Shot Studio
 Mastered at 821 Sound Mastering

Personnel
 Shinee – vocals, background vocals
 Kenzie – lyrics, composition, arrangement, directing
 Dem Jointz – composition, arrangement
 Rodnae "Chikk" Bell – composition
 Yoo Young-jin – arrangement, background vocals
 Ryan S. Jhun – arrangement
 Robbin – arrangement
 Jeong Eui-seok – recording, mixing
 Lee Min-gyu – recording, digital editing, engineering for mix
 Kwon Nam-woo – mastering

Charts

Release history

References

2021 singles
2021 songs
Korean-language songs
Shinee songs
SM Entertainment singles
Songs written by Kenzie (songwriter)
Songs written by Dem Jointz